The Jaeger's anetia (Anetia jaegeri) is a species of nymphalid butterfly in the Danainae subfamily. It is found in the Dominican Republic, Haiti, and Jamaica.

References

Anetia
Butterflies described in 1832
Butterflies of Jamaica
Taxonomy articles created by Polbot